The Lancia Jota (from the Greek letter iota) is a series of truck and bus chassis produced by Lancia between 1915 and 1935. The original 1915 Jota was the first true Lancia truck; throughout the following two decades it was made in a number of different series and variants, each identified by a progressive Greek numeral prefix added to the name, from Djota to the last Eptajota. While axle tracks, wheelbase and equipment gradually grew, the original layout and 4,940 cc four-cylinder petrol engine were retained.

Though most were used as basis for military trucks, goods transport vehicles, or buses, Jota-series chassis had diverse applications, including special purpose trucks and artillery tractors.

Models

Jota
The Jota was Lancia's first truck, designed for military use. Production for the Royal Italian Army began in 1915, and continued throughout World War I, making up two thirds of Lancia's total wartime production of roughly 3,000 vehicles.

The Jota was powered by the Tipo 61 4,940 cc side valve, monobloc inline-four, with 70 hp at 2,200 rpm, from the 1912 Lancia 1Z military light truck and 1913 35 HP Theta passenger car.
Front and rear the Jota used solid axles on semi-elliptic leaf springs; brakes were on the transmission and on the rear wheels, and the transmission was a 4-speed gearbox with a multi-plate dry clutch.

Djota
A short-wheelbase version of the Jota, it was produced in comparatively small numbers and almost exclusively for the military during the war.

Triota
The postwar 1921 Triota adopted a modified Tipo 64 engine as well as a different Tipo 107 gearbox, in place of the previous tipo 61 and tipo 106.

Tetrajota
Also launched in 1921, the Tetrajota had widened axles front and rear, carried over to all subsequent models.

Pentajota
In 1924 Lancia replaced Tetrajota with the Pentajota. Available in normale (4.3 m) or corto (short, 3.8 m) wheelbase, with almost 2,200 made it was the most successful model in the series.
It introduced to the series four wheel brakes (front pedal-actuated, rear hand brake) and a new Tipo 111 gearbox.

Esajota
The Esajota was a very long wheelbase bus chassis. It was built in 13 examples during 1926, and was replaced by the dedicated Lancia Omicron in 1927.

Eptajota
The final 1927 Eptajota was available in normale (4.7 m) or allungato (extended, 5.0 m) wheelbase.

Eptajota buses were used for the needs of public transport by ATAG in Rome, as well as in Milan and other towns and cities in Italy.

Specifications

References

Bibliography

 

Jota
Vehicles introduced in 1915